"Paradise" is a song by Alan Walker, K-391 (the artistic name of Kenneth Nilsen) and Boy in Space (the artistic name of Robin Lundbäck). It was a non-album release through MER and Sony Music in 2021 as a collaboration with mobile game PUBG Mobile (PlayerUnknown's Battlegrounds). "Paradise" is used in the game's lobby and vehicle and also features in a release of unique game items of PUBG, a battle royale game on Android and iOS. 

The song comes exactly two years after PUBG Mobile used the track "Live Fast (PUBGM)" by Alan Walker and rapper A$AP Rocky as an official anthem of a commercial release of theirs.

Music video
The track is accompanied by an official video and features as the next chapter in the "World of Walker", the story that has been ongoing in previous Alan Walker videos, particularly the music video "Faded". Despite the music video heavily resembling that of "Faded"'s, it was confirmed that it does not serve as its sequel, but rather serves as an expansion behind the 2015 music video's story, meaning that both videos occur at the same time.

A separate official live version was released as a music video under the title "Paradise (Live Performance)".

Charts

References

2021 songs
2021 singles
Songs written by Alan Walker (music producer)
Alan Walker (music producer) songs
Sony Music singles